Penitente Canyon is located in the San Luis Valley of Colorado, USA.  It was once a refuge for the Penitentes. The area, located on the lands of the Bureau of Land Management, offers rock climbing and a campground.

References

External links
 Penitente Canyon - article

Canyons and gorges of Colorado
Bureau of Land Management areas in Colorado
Protected areas of Saguache County, Colorado
Landforms of Saguache County, Colorado